Jamma'in is a Palestinian town in the northern West Bank located  southwest of Nablus,  northwest of Salfit and  north of Ramallah. According to the Palestinian Central Bureau of Statistics, the town had a population of 6,227 in 2007.

Location
Jamma’in is located 11.26 km south of Nablus. It is bordered by 'Einabus and Huwwara to the east, Yasuf, Iskaka and Marda to the south, Zeita Jamma'in to the west, 'Asira al Qibliya and 'Urif to the north.

History
Jamma'in is situated on a high hill on the ancient site. Carved stones have been reused in village houses, walls, fencing and agricultural terraces. Rock-cut cisterns have also been found. 400 meters north-west are tombs carved into rock which contains one loculi and caves (called I-Qubay'ah).

Sherds from the Iron Age I, IAII, Persian, Hellenistic, Roman and  Byzantine eras have also been found here.

Middle Ages
A village in the Crusader era (1123 CE) named "Gemmail", has been identified with Jamma'in. It was referred to as "Jamma'il" in medieval Arabic sources. The village was home to the Bani Qudama clan, who moved to Damascus in 1156, during Crusader rule in Palestine. Their leader, and the khatib (Muslim preacher) of the village, Ahmad ibn Qudama (father of Ibn Qudamah and grandfather of Diya al-Din), left Jamma'in due to fears of persecution by King Baldwin, who intended to punish Ibn Qudamah for preaching against Crusader rule. The hilly and uninhabited area of Damascus the Banu Qudamah settled became the al-Salihiyah suburb, which was named either after the family, who were known as "the pious ones" (as-salihiyyin) or after the Abi Salih Mosque, which the family was associated with. Throughout the 11th and 12th centuries, Jamma'in was a center for Hanbali activity. The medieval Syrian geographer Yaqut (1179–1229) described the site as "A well in the hill of Nabulus, in the Filastin Province. It lies a day's journey distant from Jerusalem, and belongs to that city." Diya al-Din (1173-1245) refers to the presence of Muslims in Jamma'in during his lifetime, and he also noted  that the village had a mosque.

Crusader/Ayyubid and Mamluk sherds have also been found here.

Ottoman era
Jamma'in was incorporated into the Ottoman Empire in 1517 with all of Palestine, and in 1596 it appeared in the tax registers as being in the nahiya of Jabal Qubal, part of Nablus Sanjak. It had an entirely Muslim population of eighteen households and five bachelors. The inhabitants of the village paid a fixed tax rate of 33.3% on wheat, barley, summer crops, olive trees, goats and/or beehives, and a press for grapes or olives; a total of 7,800 akçe.

In the 17th century, the Qasim family ruled Jamma'in and twenty nearby villages, including Awarta, Beit Wazan, Haris and Zeita. Jamma'in was the seat of the Jamma'in subdistrict of the District of Nablus. In 1834, when the Egyptians under Ibrahim Pasha ruled Palestine, Ottoman-aligned Arab families in Palestine revolted under the leadership of Qasim al-Ahmad. The revolt, however, was crushed, and Qasim and his two eldest sons were hanged. The Zeitawi tribe migrated to the town from nearby Zeita (from which the family received its name) in the 18th century.

In 1838, Edward Robinson noted it as a village, Jemma'in, in the Jurat Merda district, south of Nablus.

The French explorer Victor Guérin visited the village in 1870, and he estimated it had 1,400 inhabitants. The houses were better built than many other places in Palestine, and some seemed newly rebuilt.

In 1882, the PEF's Survey of Western Palestine (SWP) described Jamma'in as "the largest village in the district, on high ground, surrounded with olive groves. The water supply is from a pool and a well east of the village."

British Mandate era
In the 1922 census of Palestine, conducted by the British Mandate authorities, Jamma'in had a population of 720, all Muslims, increasing in the 1931 census to 957, still all Muslims, living in 202 houses.

In the 1945 statistics, Jamma'in had a population of 1,240, all Muslims, with 19,821 dunams of land, according to an official land and population survey. Of this, 5,362 dunams were plantations and irrigable land, 6,625 used for cereals, while 78 dunams were built-up (urban) land.

Jordanian era
In the wake of the 1948 Arab–Israeli War, and after the 1949 Armistice Agreements, Jamma’in came under Jordanian rule. 

In 1961, the population was  1,965.

Post-1967
Since the Six-Day War in 1967, Jamma'in has been under Israeli occupation. Like many other Palestinian localities in the West Bank, Jamma'in's residents have been involved in the Israeli–Palestinian conflict, and have been a target of several raids by the Israel Defense Forces (IDF). Since the First Intifada in 1987, six people from the town have been killed by the IDF and hundreds of its residents have been imprisoned.

In January 2015 Israel forces set up an iron gate at the southern entrance to the village, its main exit point, blocking transit between Jamma'in and Marda. IDF soldiers deny entry to Palestinian citizens travelling in either direction. According to PA no explanation was given for the sudden move.

After the 1995 accords, 77% of village land was classified as Area B, the remaining 23% as Area C.

Demographics
In the 1997 census by the Palestinian Central Bureau of Statistics (PCBS), Jaba' had a population of 4,311. Palestinian refugees accounted for 3.9% of the inhabitants. In the 2007 PCBS census, the population grew to 6,225, living in 1,010 households with each household containing an average of six members. There were 1,170 housing units. The gender ratio was 49.1% female and 50.9% male.

Economy
The two most prominent economic sectors of Jamma'in is stone-cutting and agriculture. Since the Second Intifada, the stone-cutting industry has grown weaker due to the cost of electricity increasing and the cost of stone, to Israel and Jordan, has decreased. Some people work in Palestinian government offices in Ramallah. Basket-weaving is not a major economic sector, but along with Zeita and az-Zawiya, Jamma'in is well known for producing baskets made from olive wood fronds.

Olives are the primary crop grown. There are two or three sheep and cow farms in Jamma'in. Milk, yogurt and cheese are sold in the town. There are two mosques, a religious charity and a library in the town. There are five schools in Jamma'in; Two boys' schools, two girls' schools and co-ed school. Over 90% of the population over the age of 10 is literate. Most university students attend the an-Najah National University.

Government
In the 2005 Palestinian municipal elections, the Hamas-backed Al-Islamiya for Reform list won seven seats, the majority, and the Fatah-backed Martyrs list won three seats and an Independent list won the remaining seat. Female candidates won two seats. 'Izzat Mahmoud Zeitawi succeeded Ahmad Mahmoud Zeitawi as head of the municipality of Jamma'in.

References

Bibliography

External links 
Welcome to Jamma'in
 Jamma’in, Welcome to Palestine
Survey of Western Palestine, Map 14:    IAA, Wikimedia commons 
Jamma'in Town Profile, Applied Research Institute–Jerusalem (ARIJ)
Jamma'in (aerial photo), ARIJ
 Jamma'in Village Profile

Towns in the West Bank
Throne villages
Municipalities of West Bank